Katinka is a feminine given name possibly originating in Hungary. It is the pet form of Katerina or Ekaterina, meaning "pure" and cognate to the English name Catherine. It may also refer to:

Arts
 Katinka (film), a 1988 film directed by Max von Sydow
 Katinka (operetta), a 1915 operetta by Otto Harbach and Rudolf Friml
 "Katinka" (song), the Dutch entry to the Eurovision Song Contest 1962

People and characters
 Katinka Hosszú (born 1989), Hungarian swimmer
 Katinka Mann (1925–2022), American artist and sculptor
 Katinka van de Velde, a Dutch Governor's wife, in Wilbur Smith's Birds of Prey
 Katinka Ingabogovinanana, a fictional character in the 2001 film Zoolander

Places
 Katinka Village, Wisconsin